The 2004–05 Midland Football Combination season was the 68th in the history of Midland Football Combination, a football competition in England.

Premier Division

The Premier Division featured 19 clubs which competed in the division last season, along with three new clubs, promoted from Division One:
Barnt Green Spartak
Bloxwich Town
Pilkington XXX

League table

References

2004–05
10